The 1964–65 Divizia C was the 9th season of Liga III, the third tier of the Romanian football league system. 

The format has been changed from four series of 12 teams to four series of 14 teams. At the end of the season, the winners of the each series promoted to Divizia B and the last two places from each series relegated to Regional Championship.

Team changes

To Divizia C
Relegated from Divizia B
 Ceahlăul Piatra Neamț
 Arieșul Turda
 Foresta Fălticeni
 Flamura Roșie Oradea

Promoted from Regional Championship
 Victoria Piatra Neamț
 Aiud
 Foresta Sighetu Marmației
 Siretul Rădăuți
 Marina Mangalia
 Minerul Anina
 Minerul Câmpulung
 Rulmentul Brașov

From Divizia C
Promoted to Divizia B
 CFR Roșiori
 Laminorul Brăila
 Recolta Carei
 Vagonul Arad
Relegated to Regional Championship
 —

Renamed teams

Dinamo Suceava was renamed as Viitorul Suceava.

Moldova Iași was renamed as Dinamo Moldova Iași.

Unirea Botoșani was renamed as Textila Botoșani.

Siretul Rădăuți was renamed as Metalul Rădăuți.

Siderurgistul Hunedoara was renamed as Metalul Hunedoara.

Metalurgistul Baia Mare was renamed as Topitorul Baia Mare.

Rapid Târgu Mureș was renamed as Unirea Târgu Mureș.

Flamura Roșie Oradea was renamed as Olimpia Oradea.

League tables

East Series

South Series

West Series

North Series

See also 
 1964–65 Divizia A
 1964–65 Divizia B

References 

Liga III seasons
3
Romania